Monkton, also known as Monkton Boro, is a town in Addison County, Vermont, United States. The population was 2,079 at the 2020 census.

Geography
It is situated on the eastern edge of the Champlain Valley, in the foothills of the Green Mountains. It is bordered by the town of Ferrisburgh to the west, New Haven and Bristol to the south, and Starksboro to the east. To the north are the towns of Charlotte and Hinesburg in Chittenden County.

Monkton is home to Cedar Lake, located north of the center of town between the communities of "Monkton Boro" and Monkton Ridge.

History

Monkton was chartered in 1762.

There are iron ore deposits around Monkton and cannonballs for Macdonough's fleet, which was built in Vergennes during the War of 1812, were made from Monkton iron.

Quaker minister Joseph Hoag and his wife Huldah Hoag are buried in the Quaker cemetery in Monkton Boro.

Monkton's observance of the U.S. Bicentennial began with a number of small community projects which culminated with a two-day extravaganza on August 21 and August 22, 1976. The first of the preliminary projects was to place American flags on all the veterans' graves in the town cemeteries, with the second the making of over forty quilts. Finally, two banners were made to announce the upcoming weekend of events.

Community organizations
Cedar Lake Homemakers Club
This club is intended to be an informal means of sharing ideas and methods for better homemaking through charity work and donations.

Florona Grange
The Grange, which helped sponsor 1976 Bicentennial events, was organized at the Town Hall on July 17, 1940 with 96 members. Throughout World War II, the Grange helped in the war effort and supported the servicemen and women.

Friendly Circle
This club's community outreach is expressed by visits to the sick, gifts to the needy and annual pre-Thanksgiving dinner for senior citizens.

Monkton Museum and Historical Society
The purpose of this organization is to encourage and make possible the study of Monkton history and to provide a central location where Monkton residents can share their interests in local history.

Monkton Volunteer Fire Department
The fire department was founded on February 9, 1972, at a public meeting in the Monkton Central School.

Monkton Parents Teachers Organization
The PTO has been a town organization for many years.

Demographics

As of the census of 2000, there were 1,759 people, 642 households, and 503 families residing in the town.  The population density was 48.8 people per square mile (18.9/km2).  There were 687 housing units at an average density of 19.1 per square mile (7.4/km2).  The racial makeup of the town was 98.64% White, 0.17% African American, 0.23% Native American, 0.40% Asian, 0.06% from other races, and 0.51% from two or more races. Hispanic or Latino of any race were 0.51% of the population.

There were 642 households, out of which 41.4% had children under the age of 18 living with them, 69.3% were married couples living together, 6.1% had a female householder with no husband present, and 21.5% were non-families. 15.0% of all households were made up of individuals, and 4.5% had someone living alone who was 65 years of age or older. The average household size was 2.74 and the average family size was 3.06.

In the town, the age distribution of the population shows 28.5% under the age of 18, 4.8% from 18 to 24, 32.7% from 25 to 44, 27.8% from 45 to 64, and 6.1% who were 65 years of age or older. The median age was 37 years. For every 100 females, there were 97.9 males.  For every 100 females age 18 and over, there were 91.3 males.

The median income for a household in the town was $53,807, and the median income for a family was $58,611. Males had a median income of $38,424 versus $27,179 for females. The per capita income for the town was $22,256. About 1.9% of families and 3.6% of the population were below the poverty line, including 3.8% of those under age 18 and 8.7% of those age 65 or over.

Notable people

 Frank Dupee, baseball player
 Eva Munson Smith (1843–1915), composer, poet, author
 Pete Sutherland (1951–2022), folklorist

References

External links
 Town of Monkton official website

 
Towns in Vermont
Towns in Addison County, Vermont